Cavaliere Modesto Marini (born in Lake Garda, Italy) is an Italian chef, restaurateur and entrepreneur. He is the Founder of The Marini's Group which includes Marini's on 57 (Malaysia's highest rooftop bar, lounge and contemporary Italian restaurant), Marble 8 (Kuala Lumpur's premier steakhouse specializing in producing its own dry-aged steak); and M Marini Caffè, Malaysia's first dedicated champagne and caviar cafe.

Cavaliere Modesto Marini was awarded the prestigious Ordine Della Stella D’Italia (Knight of the Order of the Star of Italy) award in October 2016, which carries the title “Cavaliere” and is one of the highest civilian honors of the Italian government.

It recognizes Italians living abroad or foreigners who have been instrumental in the preservation and promotion of national prestige abroad, who have made important contributions to relations between their country and Italy. It is awarded in many areas, including philanthropic activities, scientific and technological research, commercial enterprises and the promotion of Italian food and wine.

Career
Cav. Modesto Marini started cooking when he was a teenager and completed professional culinary training before working as sous chef at Cecconi's in London's Mayfair, which was patronised by royalty and celebrities. He moved to Singapore when he was 21 to be a sous chef at Da Paolo restaurant. He moved to Malaysia in 1995 and settled there. It was during this time that he opened a successful chain of Italian restaurants called Modesto's. By 2008, the chain had nine outlets, and hosted a Ferrari party in 2000. It also hosted Formula 1 and MotoGP stars like Jarno Trulli, Valentino Rossi and Loris Capirossi, with Trulli launching his wines at the outlet. He later disposed his shares in the chain, which also included restaurants in Singapore and Indonesia.

The Marini's Group
In 2012, he opened Marini's on 57, the highest rooftop bar, restaurant and lounge in Malaysia, located at Menara Tower 3 Kuala Lumpur.

Cav. Modesto Marini opened another two establishments in 2014: M Marini Caffè, Malaysia's first dedicated champagne and caviar cafe located in Suria KLCC, and Marble 8, a premium steakhouse in Kuala Lumpur that specializes in their own dry-aged steaks.

Marini's on 57 has hosted a number of royals and celebrities including but not limited to the Crown Prince of Denmark His Royal Highness Frederik, Anna Fendi, Jarno Trulli, Max Biaggi, Tiger Woods, Bon Jovi, Eric Cantona, Formula One drivers Lewis Hamilton and Nico Rosberg, former English footballer and manager Glenn Hoddle, LPGA stars Paula Creamer and Michelle Wie, Danish tennis player Caroline Wozniacki, American PGA Professional Chris Stroud, season one winner of Masterchef Whitney Miller, designer Jimmy Choo, singer Nicole Scherzinger, and Rick Harrison and Corey Harrison of Pawn Stars. It was also the venue of the after-party of the 2014 Laureus World Sports Awards.

Annual F1 Party Paddock

2014 saw British House Music DJ Danny Rampling, who is widely credited as one of the original founders of the UK's rave/club scene, and his wife, Ilona Rampling, to perform at Marini's on 57's first Formula 1 event - Party Paddock at the Top. Subsequent years saw the likes of Joey Negro [2015], and Simon Dunmore [2016] (Founder of Defected Records) follow suit. The annual F1 Party Paddock events take place annually during F1 weekend in Kuala Lumpur, Malaysia.

Sunset Hours Albums
In 2014 Cav. Modesto Marini collaborated with the Godfather of Balearic Chill Out Music, DJ José Padilla, to create an album which would commemorate the second anniversary of the bar at Marini's on 57 called Sunset Hours Volume One. The album launched in Ibiza, Spain, on 20 June 2014.

Sunset Hours Vol.2 compiled by popular and respected melodic chill-out DJs Chris Coco (UK) and Afterlife (UK) launched in Ibiza, Spain 9 August 2015.

Sunset Hours Vol.3 compiled by Simon Mills (UK) launched in Ibiza, Spain 20 July 2016.

Awards
Cav. Modesto Marini received the Superbrands award in 2003. and was the recipient of the Hospitality Asia Platinum Awards' Icon of the Year award in 2013. Marini's on 57 received the Signum Virtutis (Seal of Excellence), Seven Stars Global Luxury Awards, which was presented to Modesto Marini by Prince della Torre e Tasso in 2014.    Marini's on 57 has also received the World Branding Award under the category of Restaurant, for three consecutive years 2014–2016.

Personal life
Cav. Modesto Marini is married to Elizabeth Marini and they have two children.

See also
 The Marini's Group
 Monte Verde

References

External links
 The Marini's Group
 Marini's on 57
 Marble 8
 M Marini Caffe
 / MariGin Bar
 Marimabar
 Maracana33
 By Marini's Blog
 Monte Verde

Living people
Italian chefs
Italian restaurateurs
Chefs of Italian cuisine
Year of birth missing (living people)